Andrzej Słowakiewicz (born January 22, 1951) is a former Polish ice hockey player. He played for the Poland men's national ice hockey team at the 1976 Winter Olympics in Innsbruck.

He is the younger brother of Józef Słowakiewicz, who played for the Polish national team at the 1972 Winter Olympics.

References

1951 births
Living people
Ice hockey players at the 1976 Winter Olympics
Olympic ice hockey players of Poland
People from Nowy Targ
Polish ice hockey defencemen
Podhale Nowy Targ players